Giulia Barreto Benite (born 14 June 2008) is a Brazilian actress. She is known for portraying Monica in Monica and Friends: Bonds.

Biography and career
Giulia was born in São Paulo, daughter of Clenci Benite and Adriana Barreto. She has a sister, Bela Benite, who was a theater student. Inspired by her sister, Giulia did some auditions for films, but wasn't successful. In April 2017 she took the audition to play Monica in the film Bonds and got the part. Bonds was released in 2019 and Giulia was acclaimed. The role provided her with new work, and still in 2019 she participated in the series Segunda Chamada and recorded the film 10 Horas para o Natal, with Luis Lobianco, Lorena Queiroz and Pedro Miranda. She won the Revelation of the Year award, from My Nick Awards, for the role of Monica. In 2021, she will star in the sequence of Bonds, Lições.

Filmography

Television

Cinema

Awards and nominations

References

External links
 
 

2008 births
Actresses from São Paulo
Brazilian television actresses
Brazilian film actresses
Monica's Gang
Brazilian child actresses
Living people